The 2012 Tampa Bay Rowdies season was the current Tampa Bay Rowdies' third season of existence, and second in the North American Soccer League. Including the original Rowdies franchise and the Tampa Bay Mutiny, this was the 25th season of a professional soccer team fielded in the Tampa Bay region.

Background 

After their first season, the FC Tampa Bay Rowdies were forced by Classic Ink to discontinue use of the "Rowdies" name, resulting in their name being FC Tampa Bay. Before the 2012 season began, however, the team came to terms with Classic Ink to purchase the "Rowdies" name.

In the previous season, the Rowdies rallied to a third-place finish before bowing out in a first-round playoff match against eventual NASL Champions NSC Minnesota Stars. In 2012, the Rowdies finished second in the league with a 12–9–7 record. In the 2012 playoffs, they first defeated Carolina RailHawks FC, 5–4, on aggregate in the semifinals to advance to the Soccer Bowl. There they avenged the previous season's playoff loss by defeating defending champion, Minnesota, in the NASL Championship Series. They won the title in dramatic fashion, 3–2, on penalty kicks, after making up a two-goal aggregate deficit in regulation, and then surviving 30 minutes of extra time while short-handed. For the region of Tampa Bay, it was the first North American Soccer League championship since the original Rowdies won Soccer Bowl '75.

Club

Roster
as of August 25, 2012

Squad information

Match results

Friendlies

North America Soccer League 

All times from this point on are Eastern Daylight Time (UTC-04:00)

Standings

Results summary

Match results

Playoffs 

Tampa Bay won 5–4 on aggregate and qualified for the NASL Championship Series.

3–3 on aggregate; Tampa Bay won the 2012 NASL Championship on penalty kicks.

U.S. Open Cup 

Tampa Bay entered with the other U.S.-based teams from the NASL and USL Pro in the second round. The first two rounds were drawn on May 1, 2012.

Ponce De Leon Cup 
The Ponce De Leon Cup was a fan-based derby and trophy that was created in 2006. Participants were originally United Soccer Leagues first division teams (later USSF-D2, then NASL teams) based in lands that Spanish explorer, Juan Ponce de León, had visited; namely Florida and Puerto Rico. It was awarded to the club with the best record in league games versus the other participants. The trophy itself was purported to have been destroyed in 2010 in a warehouse fire. 2012 was the final year that the cup was awarded, as the Puerto Rico Islanders ceased operation following the NASL season.

Honors
NASL Champions
NASL Fair Play Award

Individual honors
NASL Coach of the Year
 Ricky Hill

NASL Best XI
 Jeff Attinella, Takuya Yamada, Luke Mulholland

Transfers

In

Out

Loan in

Loan out

See also 
 2012 in American soccer
 2012 North American Soccer League season

References 

2012
American soccer clubs 2012 season
2012 North American Soccer League season
Sports in St. Petersburg, Florida
2012 in sports in Florida